Free Spirit is the second studio album by American singer Khalid, released on April 5, 2019, through RCA Records. It is the follow-up to his 2018 EP Suncity, and includes the single "Talk". Khalid also announced a short film directed by Emil Nava to accompany the album, which was released on April 3. The album debuted at number one on the US Billboard 200 and received mixed reviews from music critics.

Background
Khalid announced the title on social media on February 28. He had previously shown the van pictured on the cover in various posts.

Short film
A short film accompanying the album was released on Khalid's YouTube channel on the same day of the album's release.

Singles
"Talk" was released on February 7, 2019, as the album's lead single. "Right Back" featuring A Boogie wit da Hoodie was released on August 2 as the album's second single.

Promotional singles
On March 7, "My Bad" was released with the album pre-order as a promotional single. "Self" was released on March 29, 2019. On April 3, "Don't Pretend", featuring Safe, was released with the launch of Free Spirit Radio on Beats 1.

Other songs
The album also includes the singles "Better" and "Saturday Nights" from Khalid's 2018 EP Suncity.

Critical reception

Free Spirit was met with mixed reviews. At Metacritic, which assigns a normalized rating out of 100 to reviews from mainstream critics, the album has an average score of 58, based on 15 reviews.

Reviewing for The Guardian, Alexis Petridis found the album less original than Khalid's previous work, with the singer having little new to add to the theme of anxiety explored in other "fretfully self-examining R&B", instead showing "a tendency to fall back on cliche". With regards to its musical aspect, the critic complained of a lengthy, "somnambulant pace", but observed some "great pop songs", like "Alive" and "My Bad".

More positive was Robert Christgau, who wrote in his column for Vice that while Khalid's new "privileges and woes" may be foreign to most listeners, he "retains the gift of expressing his feelings in songs that cut star-time inevitabilities down to human scale", observing truisms in lyrics such as "Couldn't have known it would ever be this hard", "I didn't text you because I was workin'", and "If the love feels good it'll work out". Christgau also pointed out that "because Khalid now enjoys access to pricier musical materials than when he was in high school, the hooks pack more texture than tune, making this the rare album that comes fully into its own when you up the volume."

Commercial performance
Free Spirit debuted atop the US Billboard 200 with 202,000 album-equivalent units (including 85,000 pure album sales) in its first week. It is Khalid's first US number-one album.

Track listing

Charts

Weekly charts

Year-end charts

Decade-end charts

Certifications

References

2019 albums
Khalid (singer) albums
Albums produced by Al Shux
Albums produced by D'Mile
Albums produced by DJ Dahi
Albums produced by Hit-Boy
Albums produced by Murda Beatz
Albums produced by Stargate